Sohail Inayatullah is a Pakistani-born Australian academic, futures studies researcher and a professor at the Graduate Institute of Futures Studies at Tamkang University in Taipei, Taiwan.

Biography
Born in 1958 in Lahore, Pakistan, to a father who worked as a researcher for the United Nations and a Sufi mother, he grew up in numerous countries including the United States, Switzerland and Malaysia. His  main influences include James Dator, Johan Galtung, William Irwin Thompson and in particular P. R. Sarkar.

Academic contributions
Inayatullah is most famous for introducing and pioneering the futures technique of causal layered analysis, that uses a four-layered approach to bring about transformative change. He introduced the idea in a widely cited paper for Futures. He also edited and wrote the introductory chapter for the Causal Layered Analysis (CLA) Reader. He has described the idea for a popular audience in an article for The Futurist and a TEDx talk.

Inayatullah's work on CLA was examined in a book by Jose W. Ramos in 2003. He also invented the method the Futures Triangle and with the Integrated Scenario Method and with Ivana Milojevic, the Change Progression Scenario Method.

Academic positions
In addition to his role at Tamkang University, Inayatullah is the UNESCO Chair in Futures Studies at the Sejahtera Centre for Sustainability and Humanity, IIUM, Malaysia  From 2016 to 2021, he was the UNESCO Chair in Futures Studies at USIM, Malaysia. He was also an adjunct professor at the Centre for Policing, Intelligence and Counter-Terrorism, Macquarie University, Sydney, from 2011 to 2014 and adjunct professor at the University of the Sunshine Coast (Faculty of Social Sciences and the Arts) from 2001 to 2020.

Role in journals and web publications
Inayatullah is co-editor (along with Jian-Bang Deng) of the Journal of Futures Studies, one of the top journals in futures studies. He is also associated editor of New Renaissance and is on the editorial boards of Futures, Journal of Foresight and Thought Leadership, World Futures, Futures and Foresight Science, World Futures Review and foresight

Inayatullah is also the co-founder of educational think tank Metafuture.org along with Dr. Ivana Milojević.

Other affiliations
Inayatullah is a member of the World Future Society and blogs at the Journal of Futures Studies website. He is also a Fellow of the World Futures Studies Federation. He has also voiced his support for the Campaign for the Establishment of a United Nations Parliamentary Assembly, an organisation which campaigns for democratic reform in the United Nations.

References

External links
 Metafuture: Futures Studies by Sohail Inayatullah and Ivana Milojević
 Futures Studies: Theories and Methods
 Sohail Inayatullah's blog, World Future Society (archived in 2016)

Futurologists
Pakistani emigrants to Australia
People from Lahore
Punjabi people
Australian people of Punjabi descent
Academic staff of the University of the Sunshine Coast
Academic staff of Macquarie University
Academic staff of Tamkang University
Australian expatriates in Taiwan
Living people
Australian academics of Pakistani descent
1958 births